John Friedlander  is a Canadian mathematician specializing in analytic number theory. He received his B.Sc. from the University of Toronto in 1965, an M.A. from the University of Waterloo in 1966, and a Ph.D. from Pennsylvania State University in 1972. He was a lecturer at M.I.T. in 1974–76, and has been on the faculty of the University of Toronto since 1977, where he served as Chair during 1987–91. He has also spent several years at the Institute for Advanced Study. In addition to his individual work, he has been notable for his collaborations with other well-known number theorists, including Enrico Bombieri, William Duke, Andrew Granville, and especially Henryk Iwaniec.

In 1997, in joint work with Henryk Iwaniec, Friedlander proved that infinitely many prime numbers can be obtained as the sum of a square and fourth power: . Friedlander and Iwaniec improved Enrico Bombieri's "asymptotic sieve" technique to construct their proof.

Awards and honors
In 1999, Friedlander received the Jeffery–Williams Prize.

In 1988, Friedlander became a fellow of the Royal Society of Canada.

In 2002, CRM-Fields-PIMS prize

In 2012 he became a fellow of the American Mathematical Society.

In 2017 he received the Joseph L. Doob prize, jointly with Henryk Iwaniec, for their book Opera de Cribro.

Selected publications

See also
 List of University of Waterloo people

References

External links

 John Friedlander's profile in Toronto's Focus on Research. 
 On Bombieri's asymptotic sieve

Living people
Year of birth missing (living people)
Canadian mathematicians
University of Toronto alumni
Academic staff of the University of Toronto
Number theorists
Fellows of the American Mathematical Society